Claudine Auger (born Claudine Oger; 26 April 1941 – 18 December 2019) was a French actress best known for her role as a Bond girl, Dominique "Domino" Derval, in the James Bond film Thunderball (1965). She earned the title of Miss France Monde (the French representative to the Miss World beauty pageant) and was also the first runner-up in the 1958 Miss World contest.

Early life 
Auger was born in Paris, France. She attended St. Joan of Arc College and later the Conservatoire de Paris, where she performed dramatic roles. She made her film debut when she was still in school.

Career 
Jean Cocteau cast Auger in an uncredited role as a tall ballerina in Testament of Orpheus (1960). When she was 18, she married the 43-year-old writer-director Pierre Gaspard-Huit, and he cast her in several films, including Le Masque de fer (1962) and Kali Yug: Goddess of Vengeance (1963). In 1966 she co-starred in the World War II drama Triple Cross with Yul Brynner and Christopher Plummer.

When she was on holiday in Nassau, writer-producer Kevin McClory saw her and recommended that she audition for his film Thunderball (1965). The role of Domino was originally to be an Italian woman, Dominetta Petacchi. Auger impressed the producers so much that they rewrote the part to that of a French woman, to better suit Auger. Although she took lessons to perfect her English, her voice was eventually dubbed by Nikki van der Zyl. Auger would claim that she related to her character Domino, as she and Domino were both involved with older men. The most immediate byproduct of Claudine's stardom was a semi-nude Playboy spread.

Thunderball launched Auger into a successful European movie career, but did little for her otherwise in the United States. She did, however, star in a Danny Thomas special called The Road to Lebanon with Bing Crosby, which was shown on NBC on 20 April 1966.

Auger co-starred with another Bond girl, Ursula Andress, in the Italian comedy Anyone Can Play (1968). She starred with two future Bond girls, Barbara Bouchet and Barbara Bach, in Black Belly of the Tarantula (1971), a giallo mystery. She had some roles in European films such as Triple Cross (1966, reuniting her with her James Bond director Terence Young), and The Killing Game (1967).

Auger appeared in the British television series The Memoirs of Sherlock Holmes, in "The Three Gables" (1994), as Isadora Klein, in one of the last episodes of the series.

Personal life and death 
In 1959, she married writer-director Pierre Gaspard-Huit. They later divorced.

She married British businessman Peter Brent in the 1980s.  The couple had one child, Jessica Claudine Brent (b. 1991).  Peter Brent died in August 2008.

Auger died in Paris on 18 December 2019 following a lengthy illness.

Filmography

References

External links 
 
 
 
 Claudine Auger at aenigma
 Claudine Auger(Aveleyman)
 findagrave

1941 births
2019 deaths
Actresses from Paris
French female models
Miss World 1958 delegates
French film actresses
20th-century French actresses
French beauty pageant winners
French National Academy of Dramatic Arts alumni